Delhi Capitals is a Twenty20 franchise cricket team based in Delhi, India. The team plays in the Indian Premier League and competed in the 2020 edition between September and November 2020.

Founded in 2008 as the Delhi Daredevils, the franchise is owned by the GMR Group and the JSW Group. The team's home ground is Arun Jaitley Stadium, located in New Delhi. Delhi capitals Delhi Capitals qualified for the finals first time in IPL 2020 after twelve years of the start of this tournament, and qualified for the IPL playoffs in 2019 for the first time in seven years. But they lost to Mumbai Indians in the final by 5 wickets and finished as runners up.

Background

Player retention and transfers 

Retained players: Shreyas Iyer, Rishabh Pant, Prithvi Shaw, Amit Mishra, Avesh Khan, Harshal Patel, Shikhar Dhawan, Ishant Sharma, Axar Patel, Kagiso Rabada, Sandeep Lamichhane and Keemo Paul.

Released players: Colin Ingram, Colin Munro, Manjot Kalra, Hanuma Vihari, Chris Morris, Jalaj Saxena, Ankush Bains, Nathu Singh and Bandaru Ayyappa.

Traded In: Ravichandran Ashwin and Ajinkya Rahane

Traded Out: Sherfane Rutherford, Trent Boult and Rahul Tewatia

Replacement players: Praveen Dubey

Auction
The Capitals went into the auction with a purse of 27.85 Cr INR. Delhi Capitals retained 14 players  and bought 8 players in the IPL Auction 2020. Their best purchases were Shimron Hetmyer for INR 775L and Marcus Stoinis for INR 480L. They were fortunate to get the services of Jason Roy and Chris Woakes at their base price. In addition to that, Delhi Capitals got Alex Carey for 240L INR.

Players bought: Jason Roy, Alex Carey, Shimron Hetmyer, Chris Woakes,  Marcus Stoinis, Lalit Yadav, Tushar Deshpande, Mohit Sharma.

Team Analysis
ESPNcricinfo wrote The team of Delhi Capitals wanted to buy Eoin Morgan, Glenn Maxwell, Sam Curran, Pat Cummins and Jaydev Unadkat in the auction, but this could not happen. In such a situation, the team had to turn to other options. The team used their limited resources to dominate the home ground. No batsman of the team could bowl. However, the franchise did a good job by buying Hetmyer and Alex Carey.

Indian Premier League
On 20 September, the Delhi started with a win in the tournament, defeating Punjab's team in the super over.  This thrilling match ended in a tie. Shreyas Iyer lost the toss and was put to bat. Delhi scored 157-run with the loss of 8 wickets in 20 overs. Team had lost early wickets, but Marcus Stoinis brilliant inning helped the Delhi to built 157-run target.  In response to 158 runs, Punjab also scored 157-run in 20 overs on Mayank Agarwal's knock of 89 runs.

On 25 September, the Delhi Capitals enjoyed their second successive win, defeating Chennai Super Kings by 44-run. Shreyas Iyer lost the toss and was put to bat. Prithvi Shaw (64 off  43 balls) got the support from Shikhar Dhawan (35 off 27 balls) to build a 94-run partnership for first wicket and helped the Capitals finish the innings with 175/3 in their 20 overs. Chasing the target of 176, Super Kings got off to a poor start as they lost both their openers quickly, but Faf du Plessis (43 off 35 balls) and Kedar Jadhav stitched a partnership to keep Super Kings hopes, but their team managed only 131/7 in 20 overs. 

On 14 October, during 30 th match of IPL against Rajasthan royals Anrich Nortje bowled the fastest ball (156.22 km/h)and on the he also out Jos Buttler.

After winning 7 out of 9 games, Delhi were placed at the top of the table with 14 points. However, they lost 4 consecutive games after it which rendered them vulnerable to be knocked out of the tournament. A victory in their final league stage match against Royal Challengers Bangalore ensured them a place in the playoffs. They reached the Qualifier 1 where they lost to Mumbai Indians by 57 runs.Then they won the Qualifier 2 against Sunrisers Hyderabad with Marcus Stoinis taking 3 wickets and scored 38 runs.Delhi reached their first final and played against Mumbai Indians.Mumbai Indians won comfortably by 5 wickets to win their fifth title.At the end of the season,Rabada was awarded the Purple Cap for taking 30 wickets.

Squad
 Players with international caps are listed in bold'.

Administration and support staff

Kit manufacturers and sponsors

Teams and standings

Results by match

League table

League stage

Playoffs

Qualifier 1

Qualifier 2

Final

Statistics

Most runs

Source: ESPN Cricinfo

Most wickets                                                                                                                                                      

Kagiso Rabada was awarded the Purple Cap as the bowler who took most wickets during the tournament
Source: ESPN Cricinfo

Awards and achievements
The following players were awarded the player of the match award during the tournament:

References

External links
IPL team Delhi Daredevils web page on official IPL T20 website - IPLT20.com
The Official Delhi Daredevils Site

2020 Indian Premier League
Delhi Capitals seasons